Mae Flexer is a member of the Connecticut State Senate representing the state's 29th district, which includes the towns of Brooklyn, Canterbury, Killingly, Mansfield, Putnam, Scotland, Thompson, and Windham. A Democrat, Flexer previously served three terms in the Connecticut House of Representatives representing the state's 44th assembly district.

Early life and education 
Flexer is a native of Killingly, Connecticut, where she graduated from Killingly High School. She earned an Associate's degree from Quinebaug Valley Community College and a Bachelor of Arts degree in Political Science from the University of Connecticut.

Career 
Flexer joined her Democratic Town Committee when she was 18. At 23, she was one of the youngest persons in the state ever elected Town Committee Chairwoman.

Flexer worked as a legislative aide for Connecticut Senate President Donald E. Williams Jr for three years.

Flexer was elected a state representative in 2008, defeating Republican Angeline Kwasny by 3,136 votes.

References

External links 
SenatorFlexer.cga.ct.gov

Year of birth missing (living people)
Living people
Democratic Party members of the Connecticut House of Representatives
Democratic Party Connecticut state senators
University of Connecticut alumni
Women state legislators in Connecticut
21st-century American politicians
21st-century American women politicians
People from Killingly, Connecticut
Quinebaug Valley Community College alumni